was a province of Japan which consisted of the Iki Islands, now a part of modern Nagasaki Prefecture. Iki is classified as one of the provinces of the Saikaidō. Under the Engishiki classification system, Iki was ranked as an "inferior country" (下国) and a "far country" (遠国).

History
The Iki Islands have been inhabited since the Japanese Paleolithic era, and numerous artifacts from the Jōmon, Yayoi and Kofun periods have been found by archaeologists, indicating continuous human occupation and activity. In the Chinese Weizhi Worenchuan (Japanese 魏志倭人伝, Gishi Wajinden), part of the Records of the Three Kingdoms dating from the 3rd century AD, mention is made of a country called "Ikikoku", (一支国), located on an archipelago east of the Korean Peninsula. Archaeologists have tentatively identified this with the large Yayoi period settlement of Harunotsuji (原の辻), one of the largest to have been discovered in Japan, where artifacts uncovered indicate a close contact with the Japanese islands and the Asian mainland. It is also mentioned in the Weilüe, the Book of Liang and the Book of Sui.

The islands were organized as Iki Province under the Ritsuryō reforms in the latter half of the seventh century, and the name "Iki-no-kuni" appears on wooden markers found in the imperial capital of Nara.

The exact location of the provincial capital is not known, but is traditionally believed to have been in the former town of Ashibe, in former Ishida District. where the ruins of the Kokubun-ji of Iki Province have been discovered.
After the abolition of the han system in July 1871, Iki Province became part of "Hirado Prefecture" from 1871, which then became part of Nagasaki Prefecture.

Historical districts
 Iki District
 Iki District (壱岐郡) - absorbed Ishida District on April 1, 1896; now dissolved
 Ishida District (石田郡) - merged into Iki District on April 1, 1896

Notes

References
 Nussbaum, Louis-Frédéric and Käthe Roth. (2005).  Japan encyclopedia. Cambridge: Harvard University Press. ;  OCLC 58053128
 Papinot, Edmond. (1910). Historical and Geographic Dictionary of Japan. Tokyo: Librarie Sansaisha. OCLC 77691250

External links 

  Murdoch's map of provinces, 1903
  Wokou chronicles

History of Nagasaki Prefecture
Former provinces of Japan